İbrahim Yıldırım (born 15 January 1990) is a Turkish professional basketball player who last played for Balıkesir Büyükşehir Belediyespor of the Turkish Basketball First League (TBL), who played as a combo guard. During the 2021-22 season, he averaged 3.2 points, 1.5 rebounds, and 1.5 assists per game. Yıldırım parted ways with the team on 1 January 2022.

References

External links
İbrahim Yıldırım FIBA Profile
İbrahim Yıldırım TBLStat.net Profile
İbrahim Yıldırım Eurobasket Profile
İbrahim Yıldırım TBL Profile

1990 births
Living people
Bandırma B.İ.K. players
Fethiye Belediyespor players
Guards (basketball)
People from Uşak
Tofaş S.K. players
Trabzonspor B.K. players
Turkish men's basketball players
Uşak Sportif players